Polycera picta is a species of sea slug, a nudibranch, a shell-less marine gastropod mollusc in the family Polyceridae.

Distribution 
This species was described from pointe de l'Artillerie, Nouméa, New Caledonia, .

References

Polyceridae
Gastropods described in 1928